Corcoran is an Irish surname. It can also refer to:

Places 
 Corcoran, California, United States
 Corcoran, Minnesota, United States
 Corcoran, Minneapolis, Minnesota, a neighbourhood in Minneapolis, United States
 Corcoran Woods,  donated by Edward S. Corcoran to the State of Maryland, US
 Corcoran Lagoon, Santa Cruz, California, US

Educational institutions 
 The Corcoran School of the Arts and Design, art school located in Washington, DC, United States
 Corcoran Departments of History and Philosophy, University of Virginia, United States
 Corcoran Hall, The George Washington University, historic site in Washington, DC, United States
 Corcoran High School, Syracuse, NY, United States

Other 
 The Corcoran Gallery of Art in Washington, DC, United States
 Fort Corcoran in northern Virginia, American Civil War structure
 Lake Corcoran, a former lake in the Central Valley of California
 California State Prison, Corcoran, located in California, United States
 Corcoran Group, a real estate firm based in Manhattan, United States
 Mount Corcoran, a summit in the Sierra Nevada range of California